Kriegeriales is an order of Fungi that are mostly yeasts and can be found from a variety of places, ranging from arctic waters to tropical ferns.

Taxonomy
Most of the species now recognized as being members of Kriegeriales were for a long time placed as incertae sedis (meaning that the exact placement is unknown) in class Microbotryomycetes. Recently, the order was described based on evidence from DNA sequence data that showed that a newly discovered Neotropical yeast genus and species, named Meredithblackwellia eburnea, was closely related to several unplaced species in genera Kriegeria, Camptobasidium and Glaciozyma and some other basidiomycete yeasts. Kriegeriales is divided into two families: Kriegeriaceae and Camptobasidiaceae. Camptobasidiaceae was described by R.T. Moore who placed it in Atractiellales However, DNA sequence data has now shown that Camptobasidium belongs to Microbotryomycetes rather than Atractiellomycetes. To date there are two genera described in Kriegeriaceae, Kriegeria and Meredithblackwellia, and two in Camptobasidiaceae, Camptobasidium and Glaciozyma.

Morphology
Most of the known species and strains of Kriegeriales are asexually reproducing yeasts that don’t have a known sexual state. All are white or cream colored, with elongated cells that reproduce by budding at either end. A handful of species have been studied in greater detail and for these it has been shown that the nuclear division of the yeast state occurs in the bud, a common character shared with most other basidiomycete yeasts. However, in M. eburnea, K. eriophori and Rhodotorula rosulata budding cells remain attached to each other at the base, forming characteristic clusters of cells that are otherwise unknown in basidiomycete yeasts. 
The species in Glaciozyma differ in that these are yeasts with a known sexual state. Only two members of Kriegeriales (K. eriophori and C. hydrophilum) are known to form hyphal cells (elongated cells that are characteristic of most other basidiomycetes). Of these, K. eriophori also has an asexual yeast state, leaving C. hydrophilum as the only species in the entire order that is hyphal throughout its life cycle. Ultrastructural studies of these two hyphal species have determined that they have simple septal pores, as is true for all other known Pucciniomycotina.

Habitat and distribution
Species of Kriegeriales can be found in a variety of ecological niches. The members known to date include plant parasites (K. eriophori), aquatic fungi (C. hydrophilum), saprobes, or have unknown roles in nature. Some have been isolated from psychrophilic environments and are associated with glaciers or the Antarctic sea. For example Glaciozyma antarctica (formerly known as Leucosporidium antarcticum) was one of the first basidiomycete yeasts ever isolated from the Antarctic sea. Others have been isolated from the leaf surfaces of various plants both from temperate and tropical regions; their role in these habitats is unknown.

Known members
Family Kriegeriaceae:
Kriegeria eriophori ( = Zymoxenogloea eriophori)
Meredithblackwellia eburnea
Rhodotorula glacialis
Rhodotorula himalayensis
Rhodotorula pilatii
Rhodotorula psychrophenolica
Rhodotorula psychrophila
Rhodotorula rosulata
Rhodotorula sp. KRP3844
Rhodotorula sp. FK.2.1
Rhodotorula sp. CBS11784
Family Camptobasidiaceae:
Camptobasidium hydrophilum
Glaciozyma antarctica (= Leucosporidium antarcticum)
Glaciozyma watsonii
Glaciozyma martinii
Leucosporidium sp. AY30

References

Basidiomycota orders
Pucciniomycotina
Yeasts